Sleeping Man may refer to:

 Sleeping Man (song), a song by John Entwistle
 Sleeping Man (film), a 1996 Japanese film